James David Thurman (born September 19, 1953) is a retired United States Army general who served as the Commander of United Nations Command, R.O.K.-U.S. Combined Forces Command, and United States Forces Korea from July 14, 2011 until October 2, 2013. He previously served as the 18th Commanding General, United States Army Forces Command from June 3, 2010 to July 8, 2011 and as Deputy Chief of Staff, G-3/5/7. He was the former commanding general of United States V Corps in Heidelberg, Germany from January 19, 2007 to August 8, 2007.

Early life and education
Thurman's family was from Marietta, Oklahoma, and he was born in nearby Gainesville, Texas, on September 19, 1953. He was raised in Marietta and received a Bachelor of Arts degree in History from East Central University. Thurman received a Regular Army Commission from the United States Army as a second lieutenant in 1975. His civilian education also includes a Master of Arts degree in Management from Webster University.

Career

Thurman began his career in the 4th Infantry Division, serving as Platoon Leader, Executive Officer, and Motor Officer for 6th Battalion, 32d Armor. He has commanded at all levels from company to division. After attending the Officer Rotary Wing Aviator Course, he commanded the Aero-Scout Platoon and later became the Operations Officer, A Troop, 1st Squadron, 17th Cavalry, 82nd Airborne Division, Fort Bragg, North Carolina.

From 1981 to 1982, Thurman attended the Armor Officer Advanced Course, United States Army Armor School, Fort Knox, Kentucky. Upon completion, he attended the AH-64 Aviator Qualification Course, United States Army Aviation Center of Excellence at Fort Rucker, Alabama, and then as Executive Officer, 3rd Squadron, 6th Cavalry Brigade, Fort Hood, Texas.

During 1989 to 1991, Thurman served as Executive Officer of the 1st Battalion, 32d Armor, 1st Cavalry Division and Operations Desert Shield and Desert Storm, Saudi Arabia.

Thurman's previous assignments also include Commander of 2nd Squadron, 2nd Armored Cavalry Regiment; 3d Squadron, 4th Cavalry, 3rd Infantry Division (Mechanized), United States Army Europe and Seventh Army, Germany; Commander, 2nd Brigade, 3rd Infantry Division (Mechanized), Fort Stewart, Georgia; Commander, Operations Group, United States Army National Training Center, Fort Irwin, California; Assistant to the Chief of Staff for Plans and Policy, Allied Forces Southern Europe, Regional Command South, Italy; Commanding General, Fort Irwin National Training Center, Fort Irwin, California; Director of Training, Office of the Deputy Chief of Staff, G-3, United States Army; and Chief, Operations, Coalition Forces Land Component Command, Operation Iraqi Freedom, Camp Doha, Kuwait.

Thurman left Kuwait to become the Director, Army Aviation Task Force, Office of the Deputy Chief of Staff, G-3, United States Army in Washington, D.C., where he remained until his arrival at Fort Hood as the 4th Infantry commanding general.

On October 2, 2006, Thurman was nominated for promotion by President George W. Bush for appointment to the rank of lieutenant general. His receipt of promotion and his third star was January 19, 2007. On December 19, 2006, Thurman took over assignment in Heidelberg, Germany as the commanding general of V Corps along with the United States Army Europe and Seventh Army. His retirement ceremony was held at Fort Hood, Texas, on 22 November 2013.

Awards and decorations

Awards and decorations

Badges

References

External links

1953 births
Living people
People from Marietta, Oklahoma
People from Gainesville, Texas
East Central University alumni
American Senior Army Aviators
Webster University alumni
United States Army generals
Recipients of the Distinguished Service Medal (US Army)
Recipients of the Legion of Merit
Recipients of the Defense Superior Service Medal
Recipients of the Defense Distinguished Service Medal
Commanders, United States Forces Korea
Military personnel from Texas